The one-volume Propædia is the first of three parts of the 15th edition of Encyclopædia Britannica, intended as a compendium and topical organization of the 12-volume Micropædia and the 17-volume Macropædia, which are organized alphabetically. Introduced in 1974 with the 15th edition, the Propædia and Micropædia were intended to replace the Index of the 14th edition; however, after widespread criticism, the Britannica restored the Index as a two-volume set in 1985. The core of the Propædia is its Outline of Knowledge, which seeks to provide a logical framework for all human knowledge. However, the Propædia also has several appendices listing the staff members, advisors and contributors to all three parts of the Britannica.

The last edition of the print Britannica was published in 2010.

Outline of Knowledge
Like the Britannica as a whole, the Outline has three types of goals: 
Epistemological: to provide a systematic, hierarchical categorization of all human knowledge, a 20th-century analog of the Great Chain of Being and Francis Bacon's outline in Instauratio magna.
 Educational: to lay out a course of study for each major discipline, a "roadmap" for learning a whole field.
 Organizational: to serve as an expanded Table of Contents for the Micropædia and Macropædia.
According to Mortimer J. Adler, the designer of the Propaedia, all articles in the full Britannica were designed to fit into the Outline of Knowledge.

The Outline has ten Parts, each containing from 2 to 7 Divisions, which in turn contain from 2 to 11 sections.  Each Part has an introductory essay, as listed below in the final column of Table 1, each of the ten essays written by the same individual responsible for developing the outline for that Part, which was done in consultation and collaboration with a handful of other scholars; in all, 86 men and one woman were involved in developing the Outline of Knowledge (see Table 2 below).

The Outline was an eight-year project of Mortimer J. Adler, published 22 years after he published a similar effort (the Syntopicon) that attempts to provide an overview of the relationships among the "Great Ideas" in Adler's Great Books of the Western World series. (The Great Books were also published by the Encyclopædia Britannica Inc.) Adler stresses in his book, A Guidebook to Learning: For a Lifelong Pursuit of Wisdom, that the ten categories should not be taken as hierarchical but as circular.

Similar works 
Other encyclopedias have provided analogous outlines of knowledge.  In the Preface to the famous Encyclopédie (published 1751–1772), d'Alembert provides a roadmap to the knowledge of his time.  Inspired by that example, in a letter dated 15 November 1812, Dugald Stewart proposed to Archibald Constable, the owner and publisher of the Britannica, that the supplement to its 5th edition should begin with a series of dissertations that outlined and organized the knowledge of their time.

Contributors to the Outline of Knowledge

See also
 History of the Encyclopædia Britannica
 Propaedeutics
 Threshold knowledge
 Outline of knowledge
 Outline of academic disciplines
 List of academic fields

References

Encyclopædia Britannica
Indexes